Tiéningboué is a town in central Ivory Coast. It is a sub-prefecture and commune of Mankono Department in Béré Region, Woroba District.
In 2014, the population of the sub-prefecture of Tiéningboué was 41,218.

Villages
The xx villages of the sub-prefecture of Tiéningboué and their population in 2014 are:

Notes

Sub-prefectures of Béré Region
Communes of Béré Region